Kadota is an unincorporated community in Merced County, California, USA.

References

Unincorporated communities in California
Unincorporated communities in Merced County, California